Bob Winters was a comic juggler and occasional actor who appeared on Toast of the Town from 1949 to 1953.

Career
As a juggler, among some of the venues he appeared in the 1940s and 1950s were the Art Linkletter show at the New York State Fair and the Empire Room, Palmer House in Chicago. He also had some acting roles in television and film, appearing as a Juggler in a Gomer Pyle episode Sing a Song of Papa that starred Anthony Caruso, as a Juggler in Doctor Dolittle and as Donald Andrews in the 1979 thriller Delirum.

Film and television

Roles
 Gomer Pyle, Episode: Sing a Song of Papa ... 1967, Juggler
 Doctor Dolittle ... 1967, Juggler
 Delirum ... 1979, Donald Andrews

Himself

As Bobby Winters:

 Toast of the Town – Episode # 3.9 ... 1949
 Toast of the Town - Episode # 3.33 ... 1950
 Toast of the Town - Episode # 5.6 ... 1951
 Toast of the Town – Episode # 6.52 ... 1953
 The George Jessel Show – Episode # 1.4 ... 1953
 The Hollywood Palace – Episode # 3.29 ... 1966
 I'm Henpecked - Episode # 4 2006

References

External links

Living people
American male film actors
American entertainers
Jugglers
American male television actors
20th-century American male actors
Year of birth missing (living people)